Volcan de Teno is a high speed catamaran operated by Naviera Armas.

History

Highspeed 6 is one of six 96m catamarans built by Incat Yards in Tasmania, Australia. Built in 2000 as Milenium, she entered service with Trasmediterránea in June 2000 between Barcelona and Palma.  In 2010 the Milenium was sold to Greek ferry operator Hellenic Seaways and renamed Highspeed 6. In December 2016, it was sold to Naviera Armas and renamed Volcan de Teno.

References

External links
96 Metre Wave Piercing Catamaran from incat

Gallery

Ships built by Incat
Ferries of Greece
Incat high-speed craft
2000 ships